The Kent Hundred Rolls are the documentary result of a 13th-century Crown inquiry or census into the rights of the English monarchy over land and property in the Hundreds (regional sub-divisions) of the county of Kent. The Rolls are preserved in the English National Archives as part of the national Hundred Rolls.

Background
In 1274, Edward I returned to England from the Ninth Crusade. During this time the country had suffered civil war during the Second Barons' War and 
local government malpractice and usurpation of Royal rights and privileges.

As a result, an inquiry was to be made into the status of the king’s rights which, in some cases, had been appropriated "by lay and ecclesiastical lords" (who had used them to strengthen their power over feudal tenants), and also "into the excessive demands of sheriffs, escheators and coroners, and also of bailiffs and other officials, whether royal or seigniorial."

Henry III had ordered an inquiry into franchises in 1255, and Edward I continuing the move to assert Crown authority at local level, considered that all judicial rights belonged to the Crown, and any private liberty or franchise had to be backed up by royal warrant.

The Hundred Roll in Kent
Two commissioners were appointed in October 1274, for each group of counties, undertaking their survey from November 1274 to March 1275.

Juries for each hundred were ordered to appear before the commissioners on set dates (the names of the jurors are recorded on the rolls) answering a series of fifty questions and providing them with an opportunity to complain or otherwise highlight to the commissioners examples of misfeasance in franchises, taxes and misuse of Royal warrants among other things. However jurors were, on occasions, unable to answer every aspect of the commissioners' inquiry.

The Kent Hundred Rolls list a number of locations in the county, many of which correspond directly to villages and towns which still exist today. At the same time, there are a number of place names without an identifiable current equivalent and which may refer to abandoned or renamed settlements.

The Rolls are, for the most part, complete however certain areas are not represented or are omitted from the record such as the Cinque Ports, the Isle of Sheppey and Ospringe.

Format
The Hundred Rolls were printed by a Record Commission in the early 19th century (1818) in abbreviated Latin. Recent work by the Kent Archaeological Society has produced the complete rolls for Kent, in its original Latin and an English translation.

The Kent Hundred Rolls form part of the Hundred Rolls collection held by the National Archives at Kew.

See also
Hundred Rolls
Hundred (country subdivision)

External links
KentArchaeology.org – website of the Kent Archaeological Society organisation
KentArchaeology.ac – online resources and publications of the Kent Archaeological Society
National Archive on the Hundred Rolls

References

Medieval documents
13th century in England
Medieval Kent